Acetone thiosemicarbazone is a chemical compound with the molecular formula C4H9N3S.  It is used in the plastics industry in the manufacture of polyvinyl chloride (PVC) to terminate the polymerization process.

It is classified as an extremely hazardous substance in the United States as defined in Section 302 of the U.S. Emergency Planning and Community Right-to-Know Act (42 U.S.C. 11002), and is subject to strict reporting requirements by facilities which produce, store, or use it in significant quantities.

Toxicity

Symptoms of exposure
Symptoms of acute exposure to acetone thiosemicarbazide may include nausea, vomiting, eye and skin irritation, excessive salivation, pulmonary edema, hyperglycemia, and seizures.

References

Hydrazines
Thioureas
Thiosemicarbazone